Cormier may refer to:

Surname
 Cormier (name)

Places
 Cormier-Village, New Brunswick, a small village east of Shediac, New Brunswick, Canada, site of the 1989 Cormier-Village hayride accident
 Le Cormier, a commune in the Eure department in northern France
 Saint-Aubin-du-Cormier, a commune in the Ille-et-Vilaine department in Brittany in northwestern France

In fiction
 Delphine Cormier, a fictional character in the television series Orphan Black.

See also